Felicia Jacobs (born 7 April 1998) is a South African rugby sevens player. She competed for South Africa at the 2022 Commonwealth Games in Birmingham. She scored a hat-trick in their seventh-place victory over Sri Lanka.

Jacobs was selected to represent South Africa at the 2022 Rugby World Cup Sevens in Cape Town.

References 

Living people
1998 births
Female rugby sevens players
South Africa international women's rugby sevens players
Rugby sevens players at the 2022 Commonwealth Games